David LeNeveu (born May 23, 1983) is a Canadian former professional ice hockey goaltender. He has previously played in the National Hockey League (NHL) with the Phoenix Coyotes and the Columbus Blue Jackets. LeNeveu was rostered for the 2014 Stanley Cup Finals by the New York Rangers, but never entered play.

Playing career

College career
As a sophomore, LeNeveu led the Cornell Big Red to the 2003 Frozen Four. He set a Cornell record for shutouts that year with nine, topping legendary goalie Ken Dryden's record of six set in 1968. He was selected to the "Hobey Hat Trick", the three finalists for the Hobey Baker Award. Following that season he elected to leave school for professional hockey.

Professional career
LeNeveu was selected by the Phoenix Coyotes in the 2nd round (46th overall) of the 2002 NHL Entry Draft. He made his NHL debut on October 6, 2005, against the Los Angeles Kings, making 25 saves in a 3–2 defeat.

At the trading deadline of the 2007–08 season, the Coyotes traded LeNeveu, along with forwards Fredrik Sjostrom and Josh Gratton, to the New York Rangers in exchange for Marcel Hossa and goaltender Al Montoya. He was then signed to a one-year contract by the Ducks during the 2008 NHL free agency period

LeNeveu failed to play a game with the Ducks and served the year with affiliate, the Iowa Chops, for the 2008–09 season before leaving for Europe to signed initially on a try-out with EC Red Bull Salzburg on August 10, 2009. After completing a one-month trial period, David's tenure to the end of the season was confirmed by Red bull Salzburg on September 8, 2009.

After helping Salzburg capture the Austrian Championship, on July 7, 2010, LeNeveu signed a one-year, two-way deal to return to North America with the Columbus Blue Jackets.

On August 12, 2011, LeNeveu signed a contract with the Oklahoma City Barons. He recorded a career best 2.24 goals against average in 34 games during the 2011–12 season for the Barons.

A free agent into the following 2012–13 season, LeNeveu returned to Austria to sign a one-year deal to be inserted as the new starting goaltender for EHC Black Wings Linz on November 9, 2012.

LeNeveu returned to North America by signing with the South Carolina Stingrays of the ECHL. On December 27, 2013, LeNeveu was loaned to the Providence Bruins of the American Hockey League, he returned to the Stingrays on January 4, 2014. LeNeveu was loaned to Providence again on January 9, 2014.

On January 14, 2014, the Hartford Wolf Pack of the American Hockey League announced they had signed LeNeveu.

On January 21, 2014, the New York Rangers announced that LeNeveu had been signed to a two-way contract to serve as a backup goaltender when Henrik Lundqvist was ill and unable to play, forcing Cam Talbot to become the Rangers' starter. LeNeveu dressed for all Rangers games in the 2014 Stanley Cup finals because of an injury sustained by back-up goalie Cam Talbot prior to Game 1 of the 2014 Stanley Cup Finals.

On December 11, 2014, he was announced as the new acquisition of HC Slovan Bratislava. His stay with Slovan was very short one, he left the team on January 7, 2015, with only single appearance vs. SKA St. Petersburg with total ice time 8:38 and 5 saves out of 7 shots.

Career statistics

Regular season and playoffs

Awards and honors

Post-Hockey career
David now lives in Nanaimo, BC with his family and is a Chartered Investment Manager and Co-Founder of Rockmoor Wealth Management.

References

External links

1983 births
Living people
Arizona Coyotes draft picks
EHC Black Wings Linz players
Canadian ice hockey goaltenders
Columbus Blue Jackets players
Cornell Big Red men's ice hockey players
Hartford Wolf Pack players
Ice hockey people from British Columbia
Iowa Stars players
Nanaimo Clippers players
Oklahoma City Barons players
People from Fernie, British Columbia
Phoenix Coyotes players
Providence Bruins players
EC Red Bull Salzburg players
San Antonio Rampage players
HC Slovan Bratislava players
South Carolina Stingrays players
Springfield Falcons players
Utah Grizzlies (AHL) players
Canadian expatriate ice hockey players in Austria
Canadian expatriate ice hockey players in Slovakia
AHCA Division I men's ice hockey All-Americans
Canadian expatriate ice hockey players in the United States